Dato' Dr. Ir. Dennis Ganendra (born 1965), DIMP, ASA, M.A. Hons (Cantab), MSc (Eng), DIC, Ph.D., P.Eng, FICE, FIHT, FIEM, ASEAN Eng., APEC Eng. IntPE, MACEM, MIEAust, CPEng, RPEQ, Malaysian entrepreneur and engineer, is the first chief executive officer of Minconsult Sdn Bhd, a leading multi-disciplinary engineering consultancy.

Career
He has published and presented papers in international journals and at international conferences, respectively on topics ranging from innovative management approaches, ethical engineering,  and transformation of business models challenged by crises.

Ganendra was appointed a Fellow of the Institution of Civil Engineers, UK, in 2018 and is a Fellow of the Institution of Engineers, Malaysia and Institution of Highways & Transportation.

He was Honorary Secretary General of The Road Engineering Association of Asia and Australasia (1998 – 2006) and is a Council Member. He served as a Director and Audit Committee Member of the Construction Industry Development Board, Malaysia (CIDB) and as a Trustee of the Construction Research Institute, Malaysia (2000 – 2008).

Education
He read engineering at Cambridge University, Trinity Hall, where he was a scholar, and secured a Master of Science with Distinction in Soil Mechanics from Imperial College, U.K. His doctorate, also from Imperial College, "Finite Element Analysis Laterally Loaded Piles" has been a continuing source of reference in the engineering field.

Honours and awards
Fellow of the Institution of Civil Engineers, UK 
Fellow of the Institution of Engineers, Malaysia 
Fellow of the Institution of Highways & Transportation.
Honorary Secretary General of The Road Engineering Association of Asia and Australasia (1998 – 2006) and Council Member
Director and Audit Committee Member, Construction Industry Development Board, Malaysia (CIDB) (2000 – 2008)
Trustee of the Construction Research Institute, Malaysia (2000 – 2008)
Darjah Kebesaran Ahli – Sultan Salahuddin Abdul Aziz Shah (ASA)(2003)
Darjah Kebesaran Mahkota Pahang Yang Amat Mualia – Peringkat Kedua, Darjah Indera Mahkota Pahang (DIMP), Title ‘Dato’ (2001)

References

Living people
Malaysian businesspeople
Malaysian engineers
Malaysian chief executives
1965 births